Thanawut Sanikwathi (born 13 June 1993) is a Thai cyclist, who currently rides for UCI Continental team .

Major results

2015
 5th Road race, Southeast Asian Games
2017
 1st Stage 2 Tour of Thailand
2020
 1st Stage 1 Tour of Thailand

References

External links
 
 

1993 births
Living people
Thanawut Sanikwathi
Competitors at the 2015 Southeast Asian Games
Cyclists at the 2014 Asian Games
Thanawut Sanikwathi
Thanawut Sanikwathi
Thanawut Sanikwathi